55th General Assembly of Nova Scotia represented Nova Scotia between September 6, 1988, and April 16, 1993, its membership being set in the 1988 Nova Scotia general election. Roger Bacon replaced John Buchanan as leader of the Progressive Conservative Party of Nova Scotia and Premier in 1990.

Division of seats

The division of seats within the Nova Scotia Legislature after the General Election of 1988

List of members

† denotes the speaker. Ron Russell became speaker in 1991.

Former members of the 55th General Assembly

References 
 

Terms of the General Assembly of Nova Scotia
1988 establishments in Nova Scotia
1993 disestablishments in Nova Scotia
20th century in Nova Scotia